Kenneth C. Stephan (born October 8, 1946) is a former justice of the Nebraska Supreme Court, appointed by Governor Ben Nelson in 1997.  He received both his B.A. and his J.D. degree from the University of Nebraska-Lincoln.  He worked as a private practice attorney from 1973 until he was appointed to the court.

See also
Nebraska Supreme Court

References

 

University of Nebraska–Lincoln alumni
University of Nebraska College of Law alumni
Justices of the Nebraska Supreme Court
Nebraska state court judges
1946 births
Living people
Politicians from Omaha, Nebraska
Lawyers from Omaha, Nebraska